The Heinkel HE 5, produced in Sweden as the Svenska S 5 and nicknamed the "Hansa", was a reconnaissance floatplane built during the 1920s. It was a further development of the HE 1, sharing its same basic configuration as a low-wing, strut-braced monoplane. The HE designation also refers to the monoplane construction, standing for Heinkel Eindecker.

Development
The HE 5 built upon Heinkel's experiences of mixed construction as used on the H steel tube, and wooden wings largely skinned in alloy. The usual crew carried was just two, pilot and observer seated in tandem, open cockpits; however, some HE 5s also had a third cockpit which could be used to carry a trainee.

Two prototypes were built in 1926, and after initial testing were entered in the German seaplane trials at Warnemünde, winning first and second places in the speed trials. The Swedish Air Force soon ordered the type to supplement the HE 1s, HE 2s, and HE 4 that it had acquired when it took over Swedish naval aviation in 1926, and eventually 40 HE 5s were built under licence by Svenska Aero.

Operational history
In 1927, the Soviet Union also ordered the aircraft, to replace the obsolete flying boats then in service. A prototype was tested on the Black Sea in March the following year, where it was discovered that the aircraft's performance was significantly lower than had been specified by Heinkel. Modifications were made to a second prototype, and this was flight tested in November. This led to an order in quantity soon thereafter, but they did not remain in service long, being phased out by 1930.

In Germany, however, the type remained in service until 1933, with machines licence-built by Focke-Wulf equipping clandestine naval aviation units disguised as training schools for airlines.

A S5 scored the only kill during WWII for the Swedish Air Force. On 21 April 1940 a S5A piloted by Lt Curt Andersson and the Observer/gunner second lt H Olsen, shot down a Heinkel He 111P (B3+FN) of 5./KG 54 at Marstrandsfjorden. Andersson fired his fixed 7.7 mm gun and hit the right engine of the He 111. The He 111 crewed by Uffz Gunther Golz, Ogfr Erhard Fischer, Ogfr Herbert Schröder och Ogfr Hans Wolf, had to make forced landing. While circling the downed He 111, the rear seat gunner Olsen opened fire with his 7.7 mm machine gun towards the German crew. He was later reported for court martial for this action. However, before this took place, Olsen was killed in an accident in a S12 on 23 September 1941. 

All other downed aircraft by Sweden during WWII were due to Anti Aircraft Artillery.

Preservation
Two HE 5s are preserved in museums - one at the Flygvapenmuseum in Linköping, and one at the Muzeum Lotnictwa Polskiego in Kraków.

Variants

Germany
 HE 5a - prototype with Napier Lion engine (1 built)
 HE 5b - production version with Gnome et Rhône 9A Jupiter radial engine
 HE 5c - production version for Soviet Union with BMW VI engine
 HE 5e - version with BMW VI engine (7 built)
 HE 5f - Focke-Wulf version with BMW VI engine for German clandestine military units

Sweden
 S 5 - Bristol Jupiter-powered two-seater (4 built by Svenska Aero)
 S 5A - S 5 with three seats and a radio set (12 built by Svenska Aero, plus 10 built by Swedish Air Force itself)
 S 5B - version with NOHAB-built Bristol Pegasus engine (1 built by Swedish Air Force)
 S 5C - refinement of S 5B with Townend ring, new cockpit and tail design, and new floats built by Short Brothers (9 built by Swedish Air Force)
 S 5D - refinement of S 5C with more powerful engine and new propeller (4 built by Swedish Air Force)

Operators

Soviet Air Force - Two aircraft, used for tests and trials.

Swedish Air Force

Specifications (HE 5c)

References

 
 

1920s German military reconnaissance aircraft
Floatplanes
HE 005
Low-wing aircraft
Svenska Aero aircraft
Single-engined tractor aircraft
Aircraft first flown in 1926